Grace Fugui Glenn (born April 27, 1998 in Nanchang, China) is an American artistic gymnast. She is currently a member of the UCLA Bruins gymnastics team.

Early and personal life 
Glenn was born in Nanchang, China and was adopted by Neil and Cindi Glenn, along with her twin sister Anna. She graduated from South Mecklenburg High School in 2016.

Career

College 
In the fall of 2016 she began attending the University of California, Los Angeles, joining the UCLA Bruins gymnastics program for the 2016-2017 season. However, she sustained a torn labrum, and so Glenn redshirted her freshman year (the 2016-2017 season).

2019-2020 season 
On January 12, at a meet against Boise State, Glenn began the balance beam rotation with a then career-high 9.975, securing her the meet title. On February 23, at a meet against Utah, Glenn scored the first ever 10.0 for a lead-off gymnast, also winning the meet title.

Career perfect 10.0

Regular season ranking

Competitive history

NCAA

References

External links

UCLA Bruins gymnastics|UCLA Bruins women's gymnasts
Living people
American female artistic gymnasts
UCLA Bruins women's gymnasts
People from Nanchang
Sportspeople from Jiangxi
Chinese emigrants to the United States
American adoptees
Sportspeople from Charlotte, North Carolina